The Canadian federal budget for fiscal year 1984-1985 was presented by Minister of Finance Marc Lalonde in the House of Commons of Canada on 15 February 1984.

External links 

 Budget Speech
 Budget Papers
 Budget in Brief

References

Canadian budgets
1984 in Canadian law
1984 government budgets
1984 in Canadian politics